Edward Hussey-Montagu, 1st Earl Beaulieu, KB (1721–1802), was a British politician. He was married to Isabella Montagu, Dowager Duchess of Manchester, a rich heiress.

Birth and origins 

 

Edward was born in 1721, the son of James Hussey and his wife Catherine Parsons. His father's family was Old English, a cadet branch of the Husseys. The Husseys had come to Ireland in 1172, and became substantial landowners in County Meath and County Kerry. The senior branch of the family held the title Baron Galtrim, although this appears to have been an Irish feudal barony rather than a peerage and did not entitle its holder to sit in the Irish House of Lords. His mother was a daughter of Richard Parsons, 1st Viscount Rosse.

Marriage and children 
In 1743, Hussey married Isabella Montagu, Dowager Duchess of Manchester, a rich heiress, first daughter and co-heiress of the 2nd Duke of Montagu and Lady Mary née Churchill (a daughter of the 1st Duke of Marlborough). In 1749, he legally changed his surname to Hussey-Montagu.

Edward and Isabella had two children:
 Isabella Hussey-Montagu (1750–1772)
 John (1747–1787), MP 1772–1787, styled Baron Montagu

Both children predeceased their parents and died without descendants. In 1753 he was made a Knight Companion of the Bath.

Hussey had one child from Martha Howel, a housemaid in the service of Lord Beaulieu:
 Elizabeth Hussey, 1780–1865, "described or alleged to be his natural daughter" (600 descendants in October 2012, mainly in France).

MP 
From 1758 to 1762, he was Member of Parliament for Tiverton and a Whig.

Earl of Beaulieu 
On his retirement from parliament, Hussey was on 11 May 1762, raised to the peerage as Baron Beaulieu, of Beaulieu in the Hampshire (called the County of Southampton from 1889 to 1959), and later advanced to Earl Beaulieu in 1784, both in the peerage of Ireland.

Death 
Beaulieu, as he now was, died on 25 November 1802 in Dover Street (off Piccadilly), London. As his only son had predeceased him in 1802, his titles became extinct. He was buried on 14 December that year at Warkton, Northamptonshire.

Citations and sources

Citations

Sources 

  – Bass to Canning (for Beaulieu)
  – Barons (for Hussey)
 
  – Knights of orders of chivalry

 National Archives File Ref : PROB 37/80 Prerogative court of Canterbury, Cause Papers.
 The House of Commons, 1754–1790, Volume 2 / Lewis Namier, John Brooke pp 664–5.
 Parliamentary Archives, Houses of Parliament, London.
 The Gentleman's Magazine 1802, p 1167.

 

1721 births
1802 deaths
Hussey-Montagu, Edward
Hussey-Montagu, Edward
Hussey-Montagu, Edward
Earls in the Peerage of Great Britain
Peers of Great Britain created by George III
Knights Companion of the Order of the Bath
Hussey-Montagu, Edward